Michelle Louise Faye Dewberry (born 9 October 1979) is a British businesswoman, politician, presenter, and media personality.

Dewberry won the second series of British television programme The Apprentice.

Early life 
Dewberry was born and raised in a council estate in Kingston upon Hull, Humberside, England. Leaving school at 16 with two GCSEs, Dewberry worked at St John Ambulance, KCOM and Kwik-Save. When Dewberry was seventeen, her nineteen-year-old sister, Fiona, was killed when she fell from a building.

After working her way through the ranks at Kingston Communications, Dewberry was head-hunted by ISP, Tiscali as a project manager. After a successful period at Tiscali, and aged 24, she decided to start her own business, "transformation consultancy".

The Apprentice
In 2006 Dewberry won the second British series of reality TV show The Apprentice, in which candidates compete for a £100,000-a-year job working for businessman Alan Sugar.

After The Apprentice
Dewberry started a business consultancy in 2006.

In 2007 she published her autobiography, Anything is Possible. In December 2009, Dewberry joined the magazine Business Matters as a monthly columnist.

She appeared on ITV gameshow The Chase in 2016 alongside Olympic ski jumper Eddie the Eagle and musician Shaun Ryder. She got through to the final with Edwards but failed to beat Paul Sinha. She was awarded £1,000 which she gave to a charity for abused women.

In April and October 2017, Dewberry made appearances on BBC's Question Time. She appeared on the programme again in March 2018. She was a frequent panellist on The Pledge on Sky News.

In 2021, it was announced that Dewberry would join GB News with a prime time show. Dewbs & Co airs at 6 pm on weeknights on the channel.

Politics
Dewberry stood as an independent pro-Brexit candidate in the 2017 general election in Hull West and Hessle. She came fourth out of seven candidates, with 5.5% of the vote. She stood again in Hull West and Hessle in the 2019 general election for the Brexit Party. She came third with 18% of the vote.

Charity work
She also ran in 2009. She is also an ambassador for Women's Aid and The Prince's Trust.

Personal life
She was in a relationship with fellow Apprentice contestant Syed Ahmed during and after the show, before their relationship ended in late 2006. Dewberry has spoken about her struggles with mental health, depression and suicidal thoughts.

On 22 July 2020, after experiencing PPROM at just 28 weeks pregnant, Dewberry gave birth nine weeks early to her first child, a baby boy. Dewberry's partner and father of their son is businessman and former Crystal Palace Football Club owner Simon Jordan.

Electoral history

2017 general election

2019 general election

Notes

References

External links 

1979 births
Living people
21st-century British politicians
21st-century British women politicians
Independent politicians in England
Reform UK parliamentary candidates
People from Kingston upon Hull
Businesspeople from Kingston upon Hull
British charity and campaign group workers
British political commentators
Politicians from Kingston upon Hull
The Apprentice (franchise) winners
The Apprentice (British TV series) candidates
GB News newsreaders and journalists